Estavillo is a surname. Notable people with the surname include:

María Elena Estavillo Flores, Mexican economist
Nicholas Estavillo (born 1945), Puerto Rican United States Marine and police officer
Vicente Estavillo (born 1956), Uruguayan footballer